Pittsburgh Science and Technology Academy (sometimes referred to as SciTech) is a public school in the Oakland neighborhood of Pittsburgh, Pennsylvania, United States. It currently serves grades 6-12 in the Pittsburgh Public Schools. SciTech's first graduating class of seniors was 2013. Its building was listed on the National Register of Historic Places on Sept. 30, 1986.

History
Originally the building served as the home for the Henry Clay Frick Training School for Teachers, founded by Henry Clay Frick in 1927, which served a training school for teachers. In 1983 it became a middle school housed at Dilworth School in the Pittsburgh neighborhood of East Liberty. Pittsburgh Frick 6–8 Middle School moved to the building in 1986 and was temporarily located at Reizenstein which in 2012 was renamed the Barack Obama Academy of International Studies 6-8. and has since been demolished. The Barack Obama Academy of International Studies 6-12 is now located in the former Peabody High School building in East Liberty. In June 2009, staff working on The Pittsburgh Science and Technology Academy received possession of the Frick International Studies Academy building. SciTech officially opened to students in September 2009 after a pilot project by graduate students at Carnegie Mellon Heinz College.

Operating schedule
Pittsburgh SciTech offers a block-schedule of classes; this structure allows students 80-minute classes.  Field trips to local attractions in the Oakland area are plentiful and make use of local libraries, museums, universities, and seasonal attractions. Additionally, students are given 42 minutes a day to entertain themselves in a list of activities which are not school related, this is called Activity Period. This practice was suspended for the beginning of the 2021-2022 school year due to COVID-19, but was later reinstated.

Concentrations
Pittsburgh Science and Technology Academy offers four fields of science for students to focus on. These fields, named "Concentrations", are split into the following categories:
 Computers and connections
 Body and behavior
 Form and function
 Environment and energy

These sub-categories cover a wide range of careers and offer early experience in classes they would not study otherwise.  Students pick their concentration at the end of their Ninth-grade year. The pickings are chosen in a weighted lottery, biased on grades, behavior, and attendance.

Computers and connections
The Computers and Connections concentration focuses on teaching students computational thinking, breaking hard problems up into easier steps.

Body and behavior
In the body and behavior concentration, students focus on aspects of health and science. Students are given accelerated teaching about different professions and health careers.

Form and function
Form and Function focuses on engineering and the various aspects of it.

Environment and energy
Environment and Energy instructs students about Environment and Energy in the form of firsthand activities in Panther Hollow creek and elsewhere and learning about the aspects of each.

Enrollment

As of 2022:

References

External links
Pittsburgh Public Schools

High schools in Pittsburgh
Magnet schools in Pennsylvania
Pittsburgh History & Landmarks Foundation Historic Landmarks
School buildings on the National Register of Historic Places in Pennsylvania
School buildings completed in 1927
National Register of Historic Places in Pittsburgh
2009 establishments in Pennsylvania